is a Japanese anime storyboard artist and director from Hiroshima Prefecture. Kimura graduated from Osaka University of Arts with a major in oil painting. He enrolled in a fine arts college to get a teaching certificate in art. While in school, he was a member of CAS, an animation research society, and was classmates with animation director Takao Kado. After graduating, he worked at Studio World. Formerly an animator, he first worked as a director on an adult work, and has been working as a director ever since.

He began his career as a storyboard artist and director, and made his directorial debut in 1998 with Burn-Up Excess. Some of his best-known works as a director include Hand Maid May (2000) and A Little Snow Fairy Sugar (2001).

Filmography

As director
Burn-Up Excess (1998)
Weiß Kreuz Verbrechen & Strafe (1999)
Hand Maid May (2000)
A Little Snow Fairy Sugar (2001)
Cosplay Complex (2002)
G-On Riders (2002)
Popotan (2003)
Maburaho (2003)
Mahoraba (2005)
Chibi Vampire (2005)
Tsuyokiss Cool×Sweet (2006)
Venus Versus Virus (2007)
Net Ghost PiPoPa (2008-2009)
Juden Chan (2009)
Sleeping with Hinako (2010)
Junod (2010)
Bathtime with Hinako & Hiyoko (2010)
The Magic of Chocolate (2011)
Ijime (2012)

References
 

Anime directors
Living people
People from Hiroshima Prefecture
Osaka University of Arts alumni
Year of birth missing (living people)